César Castro Valle (born 31 May 1999) is a Spanish swimmer. He competed in the men's 200 metre freestyle event at the 2020 European Aquatics Championships, in Budapest, Hungary.

References

External links
 

1999 births
Living people
Spanish male freestyle swimmers
Place of birth missing (living people)